Pira-pirasong Pangarap is a Philippine television drama anthology broadcast by GMA Network and Super Radyo DZBB. Hosted by Gina de Venecia, it premiered on August 18, 1997. The show concluded on February 21, 2003. It was replaced by Nagmamahal, Manay Gina in its timeslot.

Overview

The plight of battered women and children whose lives were transformed by The Haven for Women (an establishment of the nine-building in Alabang. It was inaugurated on September 30, 1995. Its main goal is to rehabilitate the abused women and help them to reclaim their God-given right to live with dignity) served as inspiration for her to come up a radio drama program entitled Pira-pirasong Pangarap, launched in June 1996 on DZRH. The following year, the TV version made its debut on GMA Network. This also the radio drama to moved from DZRH to Super Radyo DZBB, the AM radio station of GMA Network. During its run, the show raked in five Best Drama Series trophies from the Philippine Movie Press Club's (PMPC) Star Award.

References

1997 Philippine television series debuts
2003 Philippine television series endings
Filipino-language television shows
GMA Network original programming
Philippine anthology television series